Gustav Blix (born August 31, 1974) is a Swedish politician of the Moderate Party. He was a member of the Riksdag from 2006 to 2014.

References
Riksdagen: Gustav Blix (m) 

Members of the Riksdag from the Moderate Party
Members of the Riksdag 2006–2010
Living people
1974 births
Place of birth missing (living people)
21st-century Swedish politicians
Members of the Riksdag 2010–2014